Vice Prime Minister of Georgia, Sometimes translated as Deputy Prime Minister of Georgia, is the official position in the Georgian Cabinet. The office of the Vice Prime Minister is not a permanent position, existing only at the discretion of the Prime Minister.

The Prime Minister may assign to one of the ministers the duty of the First Vice-Prime Minister, and to one or more other ministers the duty of the Vice-Prime Minister.
The First Vice-Prime Minister shall perform the duty of the Prime Minister in his/her absence and in other cases provided for by law, as well as in respect of certain individual assignments.
The Vice-Prime Minister(s) shall coordinate the exercise of executive power in the field of public management as established by an order of the Prime Minister.

The Post of the First Vice Prime Minister is currently vacant, since Maya Tskitishvili resigned from the position in February 2021.

Current Vice Prime Ministers are Thea Tsulukiani, Minister of Culture, Sports and Youth of Georgia, and Levan Davitashvili, Minister of Economy and Sustainable Development of Georgia

References

Government of Georgia (country)